70 Pegasi is a binary star system in the northern constellation Pegasus. It is a faint star, visible to the naked eye under good seeing conditions, with an apparent visual magnitude of 4.56. The measured annual parallax shift measured from Earth's orbit is 18.65 mas, yielding a distance estimate of around 175 light years. The visual magnitude of the star is diminished by an extinction of  due to interstellar dust. It is moving closer to the Sun with a radial velocity of −17 km/s.

The visible component has a stellar classification of G8 IIIa, indicating it is an evolved G-type giant star. It is a probable red clump star, which would mean it is generating energy through helium fusion at its core. The star has 2.5 times the mass of the Sun and has expanded to more than 8 times the Sun's radius. It is radiating about 48 times the Sun's luminosity from its enlarged photosphere at an effective temperature of 5,032 K.

The secondary is most likely a low mass main sequence star with no more than 0.4 times the mass of the Sun.

References

G-type giants
Horizontal-branch stars
Spectroscopic binaries
Pegasus (constellation)
Durchmusterung objects
Pegasi, 70
221115
115919
8923